Kenneth James McAullay (born 29 September 1949) is a former Australian sportsman who played both first class cricket with Western Australia and Australian rules football for East Perth in the West Australian Football League (WAFL).

A right-handed batsman, McAullay appeared in 22 first class cricket matches and made 1251 runs. He was more successful at football, playing most of his career at fullback. Apart from being a member of a premiership winning side at East Perth he also represented his state at interstate football. He was a best and fairest winner for East Perth in 1971, Tassie Medalist in 1972 and winner of two Simpson Medals.

McAullay served on the Board of VenuesWest between 2010 and 2016.

References

External links

1949 births
Living people
Australian cricketers
Western Australia cricketers
Cricketers from Perth, Western Australia
East Perth Football Club players
All-Australians (1953–1988)
West Australian Football Hall of Fame inductees
Australian rules footballers from Perth, Western Australia